Joyce E. Bernal (born May 6, 1968) is a Filipina film and television director in the Philippines who started as a film editor for Viva Films in 1994.

Career
On July 23, 2018, she directed the third State of the Nation Address of President Rodrigo Duterte. Bernal was again tapped to direct Duterte's fourth State of the Nation Address on July 22, 2019 and for the fifth State of the Nation Address on July 27, 2020.

Filmography

Film

Television

Music videos

Awards

References

External links

1968 births
Filipino film directors
Filipino television directors
Star Circle Quest
Living people
Filipino film editors
Women film editors
People from Manila
Women television directors
Filipino women film directors
Viva Films
Star Cinema
GMA Pictures
GMA Network (company) people
ABS-CBN people
TV5 (Philippine TV network)